The 1905 Brown Bears football team represented Brown University as an independent during the 1905 college football season. Led by sixth-year head coach Edward N. Robinson, Brown compiled a record of 7–4.

Schedule

References

Brown
Brown Bears football seasons
Brown Bears football